Geleiidae is a family of karyorelict ciliates. It is sometimes synonymized with family Aveliidae.

Geleiidae are very large ciliates (200 µm to 5 mm), with a cylindrical shape, and a thinner, often beak-shaped, apical region. They are characterized by a ventral oral region, with buccal infraciliature organized into one intrabuccal kinety and an extrabuccal row.

The family name is based on Geleia, the type genus.

References

External links 
 

Karyorelictea
Ciliate families